The 2021 Kilkenny Senior Hurling Championship was the 127th staging of the Kilkenny Senior Hurling Championship since its establishment by the Kilkenny County Board in 1887. The championship began on 2 October 2021 and ended on 7 November 2021.

Ballyhale Shamrocks entered the championship as the defending champions. Rower-Inistioge were relegated from the championship after being beaten in a playoff by Erin's Own.

The final was played on 7 November 2021 at UPMC Nowlan Park in Kilkenny, between Ballyhale Shamrocks and O'Loughlin Gaels, in what was their first meeting in a final in five years. Ballyhale Shamrocks won the match by 3-19 to 3-15 to claim their 19th championship title overall and a fourth title in succession.

T. J. Reid was the championship's top scorer with 1-31.

Team changes

To Championship

Promoted from the Kilkenny Intermediate Hurling Championship
 Lisdowney

From Championship

Relegated to the Kilkenny Intermediate Hurling Championship
 Danesfort

Results

First round

Relegation playoffs

Quarter-finals

Semi-finals

Final

Championship statistics

Top scorers

Overall

In a single game

References

External link

 Kilkenny GAA website

Kilkenny Senior Hurling Championship
Kilkenny Senior Hurling Championship
Kilkenny Senior Hurling Championship